Escherichia virus H8 (or bacteriophage H8) is a bacteriophage known to infect bacterial species of the genus Escherichia and the related genus Salmonella. Its shape and genome are similar to that of Bacteriophage T5.

Genome
The phage H8 genome is 104.4 kilobases long and contains 143 predicted open reading frames.

References

Mycobacteriophages